The titles of Earl of Hertford and Marquess of Hertford have been created several times in the peerages of England and Great Britain.

The third Earldom of Hertford was created in 1559 for Edward Seymour, who was simultaneously created Baron Beauchamp of Hache. His grandson William Seymour was subsequently created Marquess of Hertford and restored to the title of Duke of Somerset; the Marquessate became extinct in 1675 and the other three titles in 1750.

The present Marquessate was created in 1793.  Lord Hertford holds the subsidiary titles of Earl of Yarmouth (Peerage of Great Britain, 1793), Earl of Hertford (Peerage of Great Britain, 1750), Viscount Beauchamp (Peerage of Great Britain, 1750), Baron Conway, of Ragley in the County of Warwick (Peerage of England, 1703), and Baron Conway of Killultagh, of Killultagh in the County of Antrim (Peerage of Ireland, 1712).  Lord Hertford's heir uses the style Earl of Yarmouth.

The Marquesses of Hertford are members of the Seymour family headed by the Duke of Somerset. Francis Seymour (1679–1732) was the fourth son of Sir Edward Seymour of Berry Pomeroy, 4th Baronet, a descendant of Edward Seymour, 1st Duke of Somerset (Sir Edward's grandson Sir Edward Seymour, 6th Baronet, of Berry Pomeroy succeeded as 8th Duke of Somerset in 1750). Upon the death of his elder brother, Francis succeeded to the estates of his relative Edward Conway, 1st Earl of Conway. In 1703 he was created Baron Conway in the Peerage of England and assumed the additional surname of Conway. In 1712 he was created Baron Conway of Killultagh in the Peerage of Ireland. In 1750 his son Francis Seymour-Conway, 2nd Baron Conway, was created Viscount Beauchamp and Earl of Hertford. These were revivals of titles previously held by the Dukes of Somerset, which had become extinct the same year on the death of Seymour-Conway's kinsman Algernon Seymour, 7th Duke of Somerset. In 1793 he was further honoured when he was made Earl of Yarmouth and Marquess of Hertford. The latter title had also previously been held by the Dukes of Somerset, but had become extinct in 1675 (see below).

The family seat is Ragley Hall, near Alcester, Warwickshire.

Earls of Hertford, First creation (1138)
Richard Fitz Gilbert de Clare (d. 1136), traditionally but erroneously called Earl of Hertford
Gilbert de Clare, 1st Earl of Hertford (d. 1153)
Roger de Clare, 2nd Earl of Hertford (d. 1173)
Richard de Clare, 3rd Earl of Hertford (d. 1217)
Gilbert de Clare, 4th Earl of Hertford (d. 1230) became Earl of Gloucester in 1218
For further Earls, see Earl of Gloucester.

Earls of Hertford, Second creation (1537)
Edward Seymour, 1st Duke of Somerset, 1st Earl of Hertford (1500–1552), forfeit 1552

Earls of Hertford, Third creation (1559)
Edward Seymour, 1st Earl of Hertford (1539–1621)
William Seymour, 2nd Earl of Hertford (1587–1660) (became Marquess of Hertford in 1641)

Marquesses of Hertford, First creation (1641)
William Seymour, 2nd Duke of Somerset, 1st Marquess of Hertford, 2nd Earl of Hertford (1587–1660) (restored to the Dukedom of Somerset in 1660)
William Seymour, 3rd Duke of Somerset, 2nd Marquess of Hertford, 3rd Earl of Hertford (1651–1671)
John Seymour, 4th Duke of Somerset, 3rd Marquess of Hertford, 4th Earl of Hertford (died 1675) (Marquessate extinct 1675)

Earls of Hertford, Third creation (1559; Reverted)
Francis Seymour, 5th Duke of Somerset, 5th Earl of Hertford (1658–1678)
Charles Seymour, 6th Duke of Somerset, 6th Earl of Hertford (1662–1748)
Algernon Seymour, 7th Duke of Somerset, 7th Earl of Hertford (1684–1750) (Earldom extinct on his death in 1750)

Barons Conway, Second creation (1703)
Francis Seymour-Conway, 1st Baron Conway (1679–1732)
Francis Seymour-Conway, 2nd Baron Conway, (1718–1794) (created Earl of Hertford in 1750 and Marquess of Hertford in 1793)

Earls of Hertford, Fourth creation (1750)
Francis Seymour-Conway, 1st Earl of Hertford, 1st Viscount Beauchamp, 2nd Baron Conway (1718–1794) (created Marquess of Hertford and Earl of Yarmouth in 1793)

Marquesses of Hertford, Second creation (1793)
Francis Seymour-Conway, 1st Marquess of Hertford (1718–1794)
Francis Ingram-Seymour-Conway, 2nd Marquess of Hertford (1743–1822)
Francis Charles Seymour-Conway, 3rd Marquess of Hertford (1777–1842)
Richard Seymour-Conway, 4th Marquess of Hertford (1800–1870)
Francis Hugh George Seymour, 5th Marquess of Hertford (1812–1884)
Hugh de Grey Seymour, 6th Marquess of Hertford (1843–1912)
George Francis Alexander Seymour, 7th Marquess of Hertford (1871–1940)
Hugh Edward Conway Seymour, 8th Marquess of Hertford (1930–1997)
Henry Jocelyn Seymour, 9th Marquess of Hertford (b. 1958)

The heir apparent is the present holder's eldest son, William Francis Seymour, Earl of Yarmouth (b. 1993)
The heir apparent's heir apparent is his eldest son, Clement Andrew Seymour, Viscount Beauchamp (b. 2019)

See also
 Duke of Somerset
 Baron Alcester
 Seymour family
 Earl of Conway

References

Further reading

  on Leigh Rayment's Peerage Page. Retrieved 15 December 2009.

Marquessates in the Peerage of Great Britain
!
1703 establishments in England
1793 establishments in Great Britain
Noble titles created in 1641
Noble titles created in 1793
Extinct marquessates in the Peerage of England
Marquesses of Hertford